T206 is a tobacco card set issued from 1909 to 1911 in cigarette and loose tobacco packs through 16 different brands owned by the American Tobacco Company. It is a landmark set in the history of baseball card collecting, due to its size and rarity, and the quality of its color lithographs. Several of the cards are among the most expensive sports cards ever sold.

The 206 brand was revived by Topps in 2002, having released several collections since then, the last in 2020. Those collection feature current and past players.

Overview 

The name T206 refers to the catalog designation assigned by Jefferson Burdick in his book The American Card Catalog. It is also known informally as the "White Border" set due to the distinctive white borders surrounding the lithographs on each card.

The T206 set consists of 524 cards. Over 100 of the cards picture minor league players. There are also multiple cards for the same player in different poses, different uniforms, or even with different teams after being traded (since the set was issued over a period of three years). The cards measure  which is considered by many collectors to be the standard tobacco card size.

The T206 set is the most popular and widely collected set of the tobacco/pre-war era. The historical significance of the set as well as the large number of variations give it enormous appeal to collectors. In addition, the set features many Baseball Hall of Fame members including Ty Cobb (who is pictured on four different cards), Walter Johnson, Cy Young, and Christy Mathewson. The value of the cards has led to a great deal of counterfeiting over the years.

The T206 Collection: The Players & Their Stories by Tom and Ellen Zappala and Peter Randall Publishers highlights the personal and professional lives of the players in the collection and discusses the values of the cards as well as the mystique behind the collection.

Honus Wagner card 

The T206 Wagner is the most valuable baseball card in existence, and even damaged examples are valued at $100,000 or more. This is in part because of Wagner's place among baseball's immortals, as he was an original Hall of Fame inductee.  More importantly, it is one of the scarcest cards from the most prominent of all vintage card sets.

Rarity
While the American Tobacco Trust, over three years and sixteen brands of cigarettes, distributed "tens or hundreds of thousands" of T206 cards for any given player, it is estimated that only between 50 and 200 Wagner cards were ever distributed to the public, and fewer still have survived to the present day. Several theories exist as to why the card is so rare. One theory is that the printing plate used to create Wagner's card broke early on in the production process, but Wagner was a major star at the time and new plates would almost certainly have been created. Another theory is that there was a copyright dispute between the American Tobacco Company and the artist who created the Wagner lithograph.

The most commonly accepted theory is that the card was pulled from production because Wagner himself objected to the production of the card, but his motivation is unclear. Reports at the time indicated Wagner did not wish to associate himself with cigarettes, possibly because he did not want to encourage children to smoke. However, some collectors and historians have pointed out that Wagner, a user of chewing tobacco, allowed his image to appear on cigar boxes and other tobacco-related products prior to 1909 and may have objected to the card simply because he wanted more financial compensation for the use of his image.

Value
A high-quality example of the Wagner card was sold at auction on eBay in 2000 for US$1.265 million. In February 2007, the same card was sold for a record US$2.35 million.

In September 2007, the Wagner card changed hands again when SCP Auctions of Mission Viejo, California, which had bought minority ownership, brokered a new sale—this time for US$2.8 million, to a private collector. On August 1, 2008, noted memorabilia dealer John Rogers of North Little Rock, Arkansas paid US$1.6 million for a Professional Sports Authenticator 5MC (miscut) Wagner. Rogers stated he "was prepared to go much higher and is pleased with his investment." He added "the citizens of Arkansas deserve to see this treasure and I intend to make the card available to the public." In November 2010, a group of nuns from Baltimore sold a Wagner card for $262,000 in auction to Doug Walton, a sporting card store owner.

In April 2013, a T206 "jumbo" Wagner, so-called because it measured slightly larger than most other known examples, sold at auction for $2.1 million, reported to be a record price for the card. That record was broken in October 2016 when the card was sold at auction for $3.12 million.

In May 2021, a Wagner from a private collection sold for $3.75 million at auction, again setting a new sales record for the card. 

In August 2022, a Wagner sold for $7.25 million, resetting the record for the card. 

The iconic Honus Wagner card was reissued by Topps in 2002, with variations on its background color. The card was printed with the original 1909 orange color, and also in blue (#307). In 2020, a new Honus Wagner card was issued by the company (#45) as part of the second wave (of 5) released that year.

Brands commercialized 

T206 cards were issued with 16 different backs, representing the 16 different brands of cigarettes/tobacco with which the cards were issued. Due to the same card having different backs, there are actually far more than 524 "different" T206 cards. The actual number of front/back combination is not fully known as collectors still discover new combinations from time to time.  The 16 backs are:

 American Beauty 
 Broadleaf
 Carolina Brights
 Cycle
 Drum
 El Principe de Gales 
 Hindu 
 Lenox 
 Old Mill 
 Piedmont
 Polar Bear 
 Sovereign
 Sweet Caporal
 Tolstoi
 Ty Cobb 
 Uzit
 Blank

Topps revival 
The 206 name has been revived by Topps (under the "Topps 206" brand) a total three times, the first in 2002 with a second revival in 2010. Again in 2020, the company released a new collection divided into five different series, with the first (50 cards) being released in May 2020. The collection, named "Topps 206", include players from both, Major and Minor League. The 5th series was released in September 2020.

Notes

References

External links

 Checklist (original 1909–11 collection) on T206 Museum
 2020 Topps checklist - wave 1 to 5 on CardBoardConnection
 Complete Set Gallery on Flickr

Trading cards
Baseball cards